Nepenthes monticola is a tropical pitcher plant known from a number of mountains in the west central highlands of western New Guinea, where it grows at elevations of 1400–2620 m above sea level. Prior to its description as a species in 2011, N. monticola was lumped with the closely related N. lamii.

References

Carnivorous plants of Asia
monticola
Endemic flora of Western New Guinea
Plants described in 2011